Ace Institute of Health Sciences (AIHS) is a medical sciences institution in Pakistan.

The institute is located in Lahore, and was established in 1999 as the first independent professional health sciences institute in the  private sector. The institute consists of five academic departments, an Intermediate college, a tertiary level diagnostic laboratory service, a PCR center, a dental center, and a physiotherapy center.

AIHS offers 16 professional degree and diploma programs in Pharmaceutical Sciences, Physical Medicine & Rehabilitation, Biomedical Laboratory Sciences, Dental Sciences and Medical and Surgical technologies.

Affiliations and recognitions
AIHS is recognized by and affiliated with universities and professional accrediting bodies including the following:
  University of Sargodha, Government of the Punjab
  University of Health Sciences (UHS), Lahore, Government of the Punjab
  King Edward Medical University, Lahore
  Pharmacy Council of Pakistan, Ministry of Health, Government of Pakistan
  Health Department, Punjab Medical Faculty, Government of the Punjab
  Education Department, Government of the Punjab
  Board of Intermediate & Secondary Education, Education Department, Government of the Punjab

Academic programs
The institute offers the following academic programs:
  Doctor of Pharmacy (Pharm D) Program
  Doctor of Pysiotharapy (DPT) Program
  Pharmacy Technician (Category 'B') Course
  FSc Physiotherapy
  FSc Dental Hygiene
  FSc Ophthalmology
  FSc Medical Imaging Technology
  FSc Medical Laboratory Technology
  FSc Operation Theater Technology
  Dental Hygiene (Professional Diploma)
  Dental Technician (Professional Diploma)
  Laboratory Technician (Professional Diploma)
  Laboratory Assistant (Professional Diploma)
  Radiography Technician (Professional Diploma)
  Operation Theater Tech (Professional Diploma)
  Pharmacy Apprentice (Category 'C') Diploma

The institute has training linkages with a number of hospitals and medical centers, retail pharmacy chains, pharmaceutical industries and other healthcare organizations.

Campuses and facilities
The institute has two campuses in central Lahore. The total faculty strength is 65 (full-time and adjunct). Almost 45% of faculty have an M. Phil or higher degree. 20% of the faculty has a Ph.D or terminal degree in their specialization.

Since 1999, when the institute opened its doors, more than 5,000 students have graduated with a degree or a professional diploma.

References

Medical research institutes in Pakistan